There are two bands named Drag the River:
 Drag the River (Georgia band), American rock band featuring Michelle Malone
 Drag the River (Colorado band), American alternative-country band

May also refer to a Police drag.